Reasons for Existence is the second EP released by the anarcho-punk band Subhumans. It was originally released on Spiderleg Records in the spring of 1982, and also as part of the EP-LP release on Bluurg Records in 1985.

Track listing
 "Big City" - 1:48
 "Peroxide" - 1:50
 "Reason for Existence" - 2:30
 "Cancer" - 2:16

Personnel
Dick Lucas - vocals
Bruce - guitar
Grant - bass
Trotsky - drums
Pete Stennet - producer

1982 EPs
Subhumans (British band) albums